The term Persecution of Germanic Pagans may be applied by some people to:
the Christianization of the Germanic peoples and the Christianization of Scandinavia
Suppression of esoteric groups in Nazi Germany, between 1880 and 1945, presenting Theosophy, Anthroposophy and Ariosophy, among others, against the influences of earlier European esotericism
Religious discrimination against Neopagans

See also
Germanic paganism, refers to the theology and religious practices of the Germanic peoples from the Iron Age until their Christianization during the Medieval period
Christianity and Paganism
Persecution by Christians
Persecution of Heathens (disambiguation)

Persecution of Pagans